Amphikrikos is a genus of algae in the family Oocystaceae.

References

External links

Oocystaceae
Trebouxiophyceae genera
Trebouxiophyceae